Daan van Haarlem (born 15 March 1989) is a Dutch male volleyball player. He is part of the Netherlands men's national volleyball team. On club level he plays for VK ČEZ Karlovarsko and Karlovy Vary (Czech Republic).

References

External links
Daan Van Haarlem at the International Volleyball Federation
 

1989 births
Living people
Dutch men's volleyball players
People from Doetinchem
Sportspeople from Gelderland
Dutch expatriates in the Czech Republic
Expatriate volleyball players in the Czech Republic